Judith Ann Potashkin is an American professor at Rosalind Franklin University of Medicine and Science. She is best known for her research on diseases such as Parkinson's and Alzheimer's. She is an elected fellow of the American Association for the Advancement of Science.

Education and career 
Potashkin has an undergraduate degree from Lehigh University (1977), and an M.S. in from Pennsylvania State University where she worked on the connection between ribosomal RNA synthesis and viruses. In 1985, Potashkin earned her Ph.D. from the State University of New York at Buffalo working on residual nuclei in yeast. Following her Ph.D. she was a postdoctoral scientist at Cold Spring Harbor Laboratory. She moved to Chicago Medical School in 1990 where she is a tenured professor.

Research 
Potashkin is known for her research on the role of RNA in neurodegenerative diseases. Her early research examined residual nuclei in Saccharomyces cerevisiae. She went on to examine the genes involved in RNA splicing and identified defects in RNA processing. Her research on Parkinson's disease includes defining biomarkers, characterizing dysregulated pathways, and assessing the role of nutrition. Her research also extends into investigations of Alzheimer's disease.

Selected publications

Awards and honors 
Potashkin was elected a fellow of the American Association for the Advancement of Science in 2020.

References 

Lehigh University alumni
Pennsylvania State University alumni
University at Buffalo alumni
Rosalind Franklin University of Medicine and Science faculty
Fellows of the American Association for the Advancement of Science
Year of birth missing (living people)
Living people